Cleopatra Stratan (born 6 October 2002) is a Moldovan-born Romanian singer, the youngest person ever to score commercial success, with her 2006 album La vârsta de trei ani ("At the age of 3"). She holds the record for the highest paid young artist, the youngest artist to receive an MTV award and the youngest artist to score a No.1 hit in a country ("Ghiță" in Romanian Singles Chart). As of late 2011, Cleopatra and her family have relocated and are living in Pipera. On her 18th birthday, Cleopatra announced her engagement to 24 year old soloist, Edward Sanda.

Early life
Pavel Stratan, father of Cleopatra, was in a studio recording a song with three-year-old Cleopatra hanging around. Impulsively, she grabbed a microphone and started singing along with Pavel. Everybody was stunned so they ended up recording the song with Cleopatra performing the lead vocals, and suggested that as she is younger than Shirley Temple, she should be included in the Guinness Book of World Records as the youngest talent ever to perform on stage and record her own album. Some of her songs have already been translated into English and Spanish. La vârsta de 3 ani and a Ghiță maxi-single were also released in Japan.
La vârsta de trei ani ("At the age of 3") was a double platinum disk in the summer of 2006 for selling more than 150,000 albums in Romania. In December 2006, her father announced that until the next album is released, she would no longer sing publicly.

As of December 2006, Cleopatra's biggest hit is the song "Ghiță".

In 2008, Cleopatra released her second album called La vârsta de 5 ani with the hit song "Zunea-Zunea". On 13 December 2008, her brother, Cezar (named by Cleopatra) was born. In the autumn of 2009, she released her third album Colinde magice, covering Romanian traditional Christmas carols, colinde, as a special Christmas album. After three years, in 2012, Cleopatra released her fourth full-length studio album, Melodii Pentru Copii, but without the success she had with the past three albums.

Albums
La vârsta de 3 ani (2006, Pop Album, Total length: 38:16)
 "Ghiță" – 3:17
 "Cuțu" – 3:03
 "Te-am întâlnit" – 2:34
 "Șansa" – 2:22
 "Noapte bună!" – 3:54
 "Surprize" – 3:23
 "Număr pân' la unu"
 "Mama" – 3:58
 "De ce?" – 4:15
 "Zuzu-zuzu" – 2:08
 "Oare cât?" – 2:01
 "Pasărea pistruie" – 3:44

La vârsta de 5 ani (2008, Pop Album, Total length: 32:25)
 "Zunea-Zunea" – 2:59
 "Elefantul și furnica" – 3:04
 "Lupul, iezii și vizorul" – 4:17
 "Vino, te aștept" – 3:00
 "Cățeluș cu părul creț" – 3:28
 "Dăruiește" – 3:45
 "Gâște-gâște" – 2:43
 "Melc-melc" – 2:42
 "Refrenul dulcilor povești" – 3:00
 "Va veni o zi într-o zi" – 3:27

Crăciun Magic (Magic Christmas) (2009 Christmas Album, Total length: 43:48)
 Domn, Domn, să-nălțăm (Lord, Lord Be Blessed) 3:10
 Îngerii șoptesc (Angels Whisper) 3:38
 Steaua sus răsare (The Star Rises Up) 2:44
 Deschide ușa, Creștine (Open The Door, Christian) 5:33
 A venit, a venit iarna (The Winter Has Come) 3:41
 La Betleem colo-n jos (Down There In Bethlehem) 3:02
 Într-un miez de noapte (In A Midnight) 3:50
 Leru-i Doamne (Oh Lord) 4:19
 Florile dalbe (White Flowers) 3:04
 Seara de Crăciun frumos (Beautiful Christmas Night) 4:23
 Astăzi s-a Născut Hristos (Christ Was Born Today) 2:42
 Maria și Iosif colindă (Mary And Joseph Wander) 3:04

Melodii Pentru Copii (2012) (1 June 2012)
 "Când Voi Crește Mare" 
 "Moș Martin" 
 "Mama Mea e Cea Mai" 
 "Vesel Iepuraș" 
 "Frățiorul Meu" 
 "Trei Buburuze" 
 "Hopa-hop" 
 "Ursulețul Bambulică" 
 "Pentru Noi Doi" 
 "Parcul Zoologic"

References

External links

Musicians from Chișinău
2002 births
Living people
Romanian women singers
Romanian child singers
21st-century Romanian women singers
21st-century Romanian singers
Moldovan emigrants to Romania